The Colonial Brookwood Center is a 9-story Class A office building located in the Birmingham, Alabama suburb of Homewood. The office building was previously owned by Colonial Properties Trust and was a part of the company's Colonial Brookwood Village development. Construction on the building began in 2006. The building consists of 9 floors, 4 of which contain parking and retail, and 5 that contain corporate offices.

Tenants
The largest tenant in the building is Birmingham-based energy company Southern Natural Gas, which occupies 70,000 square feet. Other tenants include Kinder Morgan, Surgical Care Affiliates, and Merrill Lynch.

See also
 Colonial Brookwood Village
 List of tallest buildings in Birmingham, Alabama

External links
  Colonial Brookwood Center Website
 Colonial Brookwood Center Emporis Website

Skyscraper office buildings in Birmingham, Alabama
Office buildings completed in 2007
Kinder Morgan
2007 establishments in Alabama